In Greek mythology, Coroebus (Ancient Greek: Κόροιβος) may refer to two distinct characters:

 Coroebus, son of King Mygdon of Phrygia is a character of Greek legend. He came to the aid of Troy during the Trojan War out of love for Princess Cassandra. During the Sack of Troy, Coroebus convinced some of his fellow soldiers, including Aeneas, to dress in enemy armor to disguise themselves. When he tried to defend Cassandra from rape by Ajax the Lesser, he was killed, either by Peneleos, Diomedes or Neoptolemus.

 Coroebus, a defender of Thebes against the Seven, killed by Parthenopaeus.

Notes

People of the Trojan War
Characters in the Aeneid

References 

 Pausanias, Description of Greece with an English Translation by W.H.S. Jones, Litt.D., and H.A. Ormerod, M.A., in 4 Volumes. Cambridge, MA, Harvard University Press; London, William Heinemann Ltd. 1918. . Online version at the Perseus Digital Library
 Pausanias, Graeciae Descriptio. 3 vols. Leipzig, Teubner. 1903.  Greek text available at the Perseus Digital Library.
Publius Papinius Statius, The Thebaid translated by John Henry Mozley. Loeb Classical Library Volumes. Cambridge, MA, Harvard University Press; London, William Heinemann Ltd. 1928. Online version at the Topos Text Project.
Publius Papinius Statius, The Thebaid. Vol I-II. John Henry Mozley. London: William Heinemann; New York: G.P. Putnam's Sons. 1928. Latin text available at the Perseus Digital Library.
 Publius Vergilius Maro, Aeneid. Theodore C. Williams. trans. Boston. Houghton Mifflin Co. 1910. Online version at the Perseus Digital Library.
 Publius Vergilius Maro, Bucolics, Aeneid, and Georgics. J. B. Greenough. Boston. Ginn & Co. 1900. Latin text available at the Perseus Digital Library.